Palatdasht (also Romanized as Palaţdasht) is a village in Rahimabad Rural District, Rahimabad District, Rudsar County, Gilan Province, Iran. At the 2006 census, its population was 99, in 27 families.

References 

Populated places in Rudsar County